Autreville is a commune in the department of Aisne in the Hauts-de-France region of northern France.

Geography
Autreville is located 3 km south by southeast of Chauny and 20 km east of Noyon. It can be accessed by the D937 road coming south from Chauny through the heart of the commune and the village and continuing south to Pierremande. The D6 road goes west from the D937 north of the village to Manicamp and the D7 goes east from the D937 to Sinceny. The urban area of Sinceny extends west into the commune in the north. Apart from the urban areas and small forests in the north, west, and south, the commune is entirely farmland.

The Oise river passes to the north of the commune and the Canal Saint-Lazare branches off it and through the north of the commune. The Ruisseau de Marizelle forms the northern border of the commune passing under the canal.

Neighbouring communes and villages

History
In 1836 the commune of Sinceny-Autreville was divided into two parts. The hamlet of Autreville in the former commune became an independent commune.

Administration

List of Successive Mayors of Autreville

Population

See also
Communes of the Aisne department

References

External links
Autreville on the old IGN website 
40000 Bell Towers website 
Autreville on Géoportail, National Geographic Institute (IGN) website 
Autreville on the 1750 Cassini Map

Communes of Aisne